Geoff Jennings (born 4 April 1955) is a former Australian rules footballer who played with Footscray in the VFL. 

A rover, Jennings first played with Footscray in 1974. He represented Victoria at interstate football 3 times during his career and captained Footscray from 1979 to 1981. Now after retirement, Geoff Jennings has gone onto become a teacher at several notable school and his current being Glenala State High School.

External links

1955 births
Living people
Australian rules footballers from Victoria (Australia)
Western Bulldogs players
Traralgon Football Club players